Opharus brasiliensis is a moth of the family Erebidae. It was described by Vincent and Laguerre in 2009. It is found in Brazil (Santa Catarina).

References

Opharus
Moths described in 2009
Arctiinae of South America